Jaw-Shen Tsai ( Tsai Jaw-Shen, born February 8, 1952, in Taipei, Taiwan) is a Taiwanese physicist. He is a professor at  the Tokyo University of Science and a team leader of the Superconducting Quantum Simulation Research Team at the Center for Emergent Matter Science (CEMS) within RIKEN. He has contributed to the area of condensed matter physics in both its fundamental physical aspects and its technological applications. He has recently been working on experiments connected to quantum coherence in Josephson systems.  In February 2014, he retired from NEC Corporation, after 31 years of employment.  He is a fellow of the American Physical Society as well as the Japan Society of Applied Physics.

Education and Work 
Jaw-Shen Tsai obtained a Bachelor of Arts degree in Physics (1975) at University of California at Berkeley and a Ph.D. (1983) at the State University of New York at Stony Brook.

He has held the following positions:
 1983　 Research Scientist, Microelectronics Research Laboratories, NEC
 2001　 Fellow, Nano Electronics Research Laboratories, NEC
 2001　 Team Leader, Macroscopic Quantum Coherence Team, RIKEN 
 2012　 Group Director, Single Quantum Dynamics Research Group, RIKEN
 2013　 Team Leader, Macroscopic Quantum Coherence Research Team, Quantum Information Electronics Division, RIKEN Center for Emergent Matter Science
 2014　 Team Leader, Superconducting Quantum Simulation Research Team, Quantum Information Electronics Division, RIKEN Center for Emergent Matter Science (-present)
 2015　 Professor, Tokyo University of Science (-present)

Honors and awards
 2000  Fellow, American Physical Society
 2004  Nishina Memorial Prize  
 2007  Honorary Professor, National Chiao Tung University 
 2008  Simon Memorial Prize (with Yasunobu Nakamura)
 2010  Fellow, Japan Society of Applied Physics
 2013  Quantum Innovator Award
 2014  The 11th  (with Yasunobu Nakamura)
 2018  Medal with Purple Ribbon
 2021  Asahi Prize (with Yasunobu Nakamura)

References

External links 
 Center for Emergent Matter Science at RIKEN  http://www.riken.jp/en/research/labs/cems/
 Quantum Cybernetics at RIKEN http://www.riken.jp/Qcybernetics/en/1_overview/index.html
 Supeconducting Quantum Computing at FIRST, National Institute of Informatics http://www.nii.ac.jp/qis/first-quantum/e/subgroups/superconductingQcom/researcher.html
 Department of Physics at Tokyo University of Science  http://www.rs.tus.ac.jp/tsai/

1952 births
20th-century Taiwanese physicists
Quantum physicists
Living people
NEC people
Riken personnel
Stony Brook University alumni
Academic staff of Tokyo University of Science
UC Berkeley College of Letters and Science alumni
Taiwanese expatriates in Japan
Scientists from Taipei
Fellows of the American Physical Society
21st-century Taiwanese physicists
Taiwanese expatriates in the United States
Recipients of the Medal with Purple Ribbon
Foreign educators in Japan